The New Zealand National Road Race Championship is a road bicycle race that takes place inside the New Zealand National Cycling Championship, and decides the best cyclist in this type of race. The first edition took place in 1934. The first winner was Frank Grose. The record for the most wins in the men's championship is held by Gordon McCauley with 5. The current champion is James Fouché. The women's record is held by Rushlee Buchanan and with 4 wins.
The U23 and elite race together in a combined race where the first across the line is the national champion. In 2019 James Fouché was the first to cross the line however being an U23 meant he was the outright national champion the same also occurred for Georgia Christie.

Multiple winners

Men

Women

Men

Elite

U23

Women

Elite

U23

Footnotes

References

External links
Men past winners on cyclingarchives.com
Women past winners on cyclingarchives.com

National road cycling championships
Cycle races in New Zealand
Recurring sporting events established in 1934
1934 establishments in New Zealand
Road race